The UEFA Women's Euro 1993 final was an association football match on 4 July 1993 at Stadio Dino Manuzzi, Cesena, to determine the winner of UEFA Women's Euro 1993.

Final

References

External links
Official tournament website

Final
1993
1993
1993
July 1993 sports events in Europe